The Ralph Mark Gilbert Civil Rights Museum is a museum in Savannah, Georgia, United States. Named after Ralph Mark Gilbert, the museum traces the history of the African American community in the city, from slavery to the present day, with an emphasis on the civil rights movement.

History 
Ralph Mark Gilbert was a Baptist pastor and civil rights leader who served as the pastor at First African Baptist Church in Savannah, Georgia from 1939 to 1956. The church had been established in the 1770s, making it one of the oldest black churches in the country. According to Andrew Billingsley, Gilbert is "generally considered the father of the civil rights movement in Savannah." He served as the president of the Savannah chapter of the NAACP from 1942 to 1950 and was the organizer of the Georgia Conference of the NAACP. Gilbert also challenged the white primary system in the state at the time and organized voter registration drives for African Americans in the city. In 1950, W. W. Law became the president of the Savannah chapter, and it was largely his efforts that led to the creation of the civil rights museum. A special-purpose local-option sales tax was instituted by Chatham County in 1993 for the purposes of funding this museum, and a nonprofit organization headed by Law assumed control of the museum. The museum was housed in a building which had been built in 1914 and had served as the headquarters for the NAACP chapter.

The museum officially opened in August 1996 as part of a four-day celebration. Festivities and events included a "jubilee gala", a meeting at First African Baptist that included a historical reenactment of a meeting during the civil rights movement, and a march to the museum. Features in the museum include a lunch counter (similar to those in lunch counter protests), photos of African-American businesses in the city, and an exhibit dedicated to Laurel Grove South Cemetery, a historic cemetery for African Americans in the city.

References

Bibliography

External links 
 

1993 establishments in Georgia (U.S. state)
African-American history of Georgia (U.S. state)
African-American museums in Georgia (U.S. state)
Civil rights movement museums
Museums established in 1993
Museums in Savannah, Georgia
Organizations based in Georgia (U.S. state)